The Premo-Porretta Power Poll is a retroactive end-of-year ranking for American college basketball teams competing in the 1895–96 through the 1947–48 seasons. 

The Premo-Porretta Polls are intended to serve collectively as a source of information regarding the relative standings of college basketball teams within given seasons during the early decades of the sport. No systematic end-of-season national tournament existed in college basketball until the founding of the National Invitation Tournament in 1938 and the NCAA Men's Division I Basketball Championship Tournament in 1939, the latter of which determines the NCAA Champion for a given season. Furthermore, no regular, recognized national polling took place for college basketball prior to the establishment of the Associated Press Poll and the Coaches Poll in the 1948–49 and 1950–51 seasons, respectively.

Background
Patrick Premo, a professor emeritus of accounting at St. Bonaventure University, and Phil Porretta, a former computer programmer, have each spent more than 40 years—first separately, and later collaboratively—researching the early history of college basketball. Their archival work has often uncovered game results that had not previously been reported in books and basketball program media guides, such as the results of competition against AAU, semi-professional, club, and YMCA teams. Whereas Bill Schroeder of the Helms Athletic Foundation retroactively named only his choice of the top team nationally for each season from 1900–01 through 1941–42 (and then annually selected a national champion for each season from 1942–43 through 1981–82), Premo and Porretta have used the data they have compiled to compare teams against one another and assign rankings to multiple teams for each season—15 teams for the 1895–96 season, 20 teams for each season from 1896–97 through 1908–09, and 25 teams for each season from  1909–10 through 1947–48.

Premo and Porretta first published results of their early collaboration in 1995. Most recently, in 2009, their full rankings were included with the core information for each season prior to 1949 in the ESPN College Basketball Encyclopedia.

National champions

Pre-NCAA Tournament champions

Pre-Associated Press Poll champions

References

History of college basketball in the United States
College basketball in the United States